The Bay Parkway is a  semi-limited-access highway entirely within Jones Beach State Park in Nassau County, New York, in the United States. The western terminus is at a loop near the western edge of Jones Inlet. The eastern terminus is at the Jones Beach Amphitheater east of an interchange with the Wantagh State Parkway. The parkway is primarily a service road for the park, providing access to the boat basin, fishing piers, and many of the parking lots along the beach. However, the parkway also has an interchange with the Meadowbrook State Parkway/Ocean Parkway.

East of the Meadowbrook/Ocean interchange, the Bay Parkway is designated New York State Route 909E (NY 909E), an unsigned reference route, by NYSDOT.

Route description 
The Bay Parkway begins at a loop at the west end of Jones Beach State Park in Nassau County. The route heads eastward, passing the Short Beach Coast Guard Station to the north. There is a quick U-turn soon after, connecting to the other side and the station. The route passes the bays of the Atlantic Ocean, heading eastward into the Meadowbrook State Parkway and Ocean Parkway. The parkway gains the unmarked designation of Route 909E as it runs parallel to Ocean Parkway and passes more median-based U-turns. The route has one at-grade intersection along the eastbound lanes with a two-lane park road to Ocean Parkway now named "Clays Path" and the back entrance to Parking Field #3. More U-turns to and from the fishing piers and bait and tackle shop and Jones Beach Beer Garden at Parking Field #10 can be found on the westbound lanes followed by the back parking lot to Parking Field #4. After traversing the Detective Betsy Horner Miller Cutrone Memorial Bridge, Bay Parkway terminates at the Wantagh State Parkway near Jones Beach Parking Field #5 and the parking lot for the Jones Beach Marine Theater.

Exit list
The entire route is in Jones Beach State Park, Nassau County.

References

External links

Bay Parkway at NYCRoads
Jones Beach State Park

Parkways in New York (state)
Roads on Long Island
Robert Moses projects
Transportation in Nassau County, New York